Drama TV (Qanāt Drāmā), formerly known as Abu Dhabi Drama (Abū Ẓabī Drāmā) and sometimes referred to as AD Drama, was a Pan Arab television channel owned by Abu Dhabi Media.
It programmed movies and television series. Programs were subtitled in Arabic.
The channel aired 24-hour without commercials, in addition to crime-related North American serials, broadcast every day under the programming block Fox Crime. Hollywood films were also aired Fridays at 7 p.m. , under the block Telecine Night. It was launched on 5 April 2010.

On 19 February 2020, the channel got a new logo after 9 years, and on 1 January 2022, the channel was closed.

Programming 
Programming included from American television series and films. For current programming, the key symbol denoted by bold, and for programming block distributed by Fox Crime Disney ABC Studios, it was denoted by a cross (†).

Canada 
 Cracked
 King
 Ties That Bind

United States 
 Boston Legal
 Low Winter Sun
 Prison Break
 Black-ish
 Black-ish (season 1)
 Black-ish (season 3)
 Black-ish (season 4)
 Black-ish (season 5)
 Station 19
 Code Black
 The Crossing
 Dead of Summer
 Once Upon a Time
 Luke Cage
 Resurrection
 Kevin (Probably) Saves the World
 For the People
 Scandal
 Take Two
 Beyond
 CSI (franchise)
 CSI: Cyber
 Blue Bloods

Films 
 Beauty and the Beast
 Captain America: Civil War
 Guardians of the Galaxy Vol. 2
 Doctor Strange
 Thor: Ragnarok
 Avengers: Endgame
 Mulan

Other services 

 Drama TV + was a paid version of Drama TV available on OSN till September 10, 2019.
 Drama HD was a simulcast of Drama TV in high-definition (HD) launched in  via Nilesat.
 ADTV Catch-Up was Drama TV's video on demand service that allows users to view past and present episodes of its shows.

See also 
 Arab television drama
 Abu Dhabi Media
 Television in the United Arab Emirates

References

External links 
  

Television in the United Arab Emirates
Arabic-language television stations
Arabic-language television
Television channels and stations established in 2010
Television channels and stations disestablished in 2022
Television stations in the United Arab Emirates
High-definition television
2010 establishments in the United Arab Emirates